Home and Away is an Australian soap opera. The following is a list of characters that first appeared in 2003, by order of appearance. They were all introduced by the show's series producer Julie McGuaran. The 16th season of Home and Away began airing on the Seven Network on 13 January 2003. The year saw the introduction of The Hunters, a new family consisting of Scott (Kip Gamblin), his mother Beth (Clarissa House) and his younger siblings Kit (Amy Mizzi) and Robbie (Jason Smith), who all debuted in the respective months of January, April and November. Isabel Lucas began playing Tasha Andrews in July. Maggie Kirkpatrick began her second role on the serial as Viv "The Guv" Standish in November.

Scott Hunter

Scott Hunter, played by Kip Gamblin, debuted on screen on 23 January 2003 and departed on 25 November 2005. For his portrayal of Scott, Gamblin won the "Most Popular New Male Talent" Logie Award in 2004. Linda Barnier of the Newcastle Herald described Scott as a "beefcake" and opined that his debut on his horse Jacko was a "very Man from Snowy River moment".

Beth Hunter

Beth Hunter (née Walters, previously Sutherland), played by Clarissa House, made her first on-screen appearance on 17 April 2003 and departed on 30 January 2007. The serial's official website described Beth as an "open-minded" female who holds a "strong sense of personal morality and integrity". When characters get to know Beth she shows a "delicious sense of humour". Sacha Molitorisz of The Sydney Morning Herald said that the episode featuring Beth and Rhys' wedding was better suited to "die hard fans". They criticised the plot for being "unengaging" and opined that the music, performances and dialogue were "painful" and "patchy".

Kit Hunter

Kit Hunter, played by Amy Mizzi, made her first on-screen appearance on 25 April 2003 and made her final appearance as a regular character in February 2004 but continued to reappear in a recurring capacity, making her final appearance on 3 July 2007. Isabel Lucas auditioned for the role of Kit, however, it was actress Amy Mizzi who was eventually cast.
For her portrayal of Kit, Mizzi was nominated for the "Best New Female Talent" Logie Award in 2004.

Tasha Andrews

Tasha Andrews, played by Isabel Lucas, made her first screen appearance in the episode broadcast on 31 July 2003 and departed the series on 10 October 2006. Lucas joined the serial in 2003 after being discovered by talent scout Sharron Meissner, who was on holiday at the time. Meissner encouraged Lucas to audition for the part of Kit Hunter, which eventually went to Amy Mizzi.
 However, Series Producer Julie McGuaran created the role of Tasha specifically for Lucas. Lucas was then required to move from her home town of Melbourne to Sydney, where the serial is filmed.
For her portrayal of Tasha, Lucas won the Most Popular New Female Talent accolade at the 2004 Logie Awards. Brian Courtis of the Sunday Age referred to Tasha as a "Blonde Princess" ahead of her wedding to Robbie. In an interview with The Sunday Times, Catholic Priest Toby Sherring spoke out against the storyline where  Mumma Rose convinces Tasha to join the Believers. He said: "Sometimes it is assumed that all churches operate like cults, who will steal away naive teenagers from their families, brainwash them with strange ideas and involve them in strange suicide pacts, or send them knocking on people's doors with predictions about the end of the world." He added: "Because religion in TV shows such as Home and Away is portrayed in this way, the media version is firstly more believable and secondly much more intriguing, although ultimately unappealing."

Viv Standish
	
Vivienne "The Guv" Standish, played by Maggie Kirkpatrick made her first appearance on 11 November and departed on 2 November 2004. Kirkpatrick previously guested in the serial in 1991 as Jean Chambers. Viv was introduced as part of Dani Sutherland's (Tammin Sursok) storyline involving her imprisonment for the attempted murder of Kane Phillips (Sam Atwell). Filming took place at the old Maitland Gaol.

Prior to both stints on the serial, Kirkpatrick was best known for her role as prison warder Joan "The Freak" Ferguson on the Australian soap Prisoner: Cell Block H. "It's been 17 years since Prisoner finished and I've not played any role that was remotely like a prison person in all that time," Kirkpatrick said in an Interview with the Sun Herald. "And now here I am back behind bars." She told Scott Ellis about her character, "She's a legal person who's been wrongfully incarcerated, She was a magistrate in the children's court who uncovered in her line of work a pedophile ring - stop me if you heard this before - consisting of judges, lawyers and politicians. When she tried to expose them, they set her up and she's in jail." She then described Viv as "tough" but "brains, not brawn". Kirkpatrick expressed a desire to return to the role; "I'm angling to come back, I'd love them to have me back!".

Viv appears when Dani is incarcerated for running over Kane. She initially intimidates Dani but begins to like her and nicknames her "princess" and feels that she does not belong in prison. After Dani is caught in the middle of an escape attempt, her chances of appeal seem all but lost. However, Viv puts pressure on the real culprits to keep Dani's name out of it and Dani is eventually released. Viv and Dani keep in contact and Dani mentions Felix Walters (Josh Lawson) has been stalking her and making her life hell. Felix is hospitalized after someone hits him over the head with a baseball bat and Dani quickly works out Viv ordered the attack on Felix, which she admits. As a result, her sentence is extended.

Some months later, Viv sends Dani a visiting order but her father, Rhys (Michael Beckley) goes in her place and returns with shocking news, Viv's heart is failing and she is dying.
When Dani visits again, Viv tells her she has been working on her autobiography which she wants Dani to publish. Dani takes her up on the offer but the manuscript is destroyed in a kiosk fire caused by Ric Dalby (Mark Furze) and Wazza Stevens (Israel Cannan). After helping reconstruct Viv's notes, Dani campaigns to get Viv an early release on compassionate ground and enlists the help of Morag Bellingham (Cornelia Frances), who is shocked when she recognises Viv's name. It transpires that Viv was in a relationship with Morag's brother, Alf Stewart (Ray Meagher) when they were teenagers and their families disapproved. Alf proposed but Viv never returned. Alf meets up with Viv again and they have an emotional reunion. Morag arranges for Viv to be let out on Day release, where she spends her final hours with Alf and reveals that she had become pregnant with his child and subsequently adopted the baby out to a childless couple, Marion and Marianne Dalby who lived in Yabbie Creek. Alf forgives her and she dies in his arms peacefully. It is soon revealed that Alf and Viv's son was Owen Dalby who later died of a heart attack during a fight with his son, Ric.

Robbie Hunter

Robbie Hunter, played by Jason Smith, made his first on screen appearance on 25 November 2003 and departed on 10 October 2006. Chris Hemsworth originally auditioned for the role of Robbie, but the producers decided that he was not right for the part. They later cast him as Kim Hyde. Smith then won the role of Robbie. Of his casting, the actor told the official Home and Away website "I really enjoyed the audition process because my character is so full of life. If there was any role on television I wanted to play this would be it." Smith felt coming into a well established show with a strong cast was a good opportunity for him.
For his portrayal of Robbie, Smith was nominated for "Most Popular New Male Talent" at the 2005 Logie Awards.

Others

References

, 2003
, Home and Away